Stewartsville may refer to:

Stewartsville, Indiana, an unincorporated community
Stewartsville, Missouri, a city
Stewartsville, New Jersey, an unincorporated community
Stewartsville, Ohio, an unincorporated community
Stewartsville, Virginia, a census-designated place

See also
Stewartville (disambiguation)